Mater Dei High School or Evansville Mater Dei High School is a private Catholic high school on the west side of Evansville, Indiana, constructed in 1949. It is one of two Catholic high schools that serve the students of Vanderburgh, Posey, Gibson, and Warrick counties as part of the Roman Catholic Diocese of Evansville.

Sports

State titles

 Baseball (1998–99)
 Boys Basketball (2003–04)
 Girls Basketball (2011–12), (2012–13)
 Football (2000), (2022)
 Wrestling (1986), (1995), (1996), (1997), (1998), (1999), (2000), (2001), (2002), (2003), (2006), (2007), (2021)
 Softball (2016)
 Girls Soccer (2017), (2018), (2019)
 Marching Band (2022)

Notable alumni
Suzanne Crouch, politician, current Lieutenant Governor of Indiana, and former Indiana State Auditor and Indiana State Representative 
Jerad Eickhoff, Major League Baseball pitcher
Rob Maurer, Major League Baseball First baseman

See also
 List of high schools in Indiana

References

External links

 
 

High schools in Southwestern Indiana
Roman Catholic Diocese of Evansville
Catholic secondary schools in Indiana
Private high schools in Indiana
Educational institutions established in 1949
Schools in Evansville, Indiana
Southern Indiana Athletic Conference
1949 establishments in Indiana